Beyond the Gates of Splendor (also Beyond the Gates) is a documentary film that was released in 2004. It chronicles the events leading up to and following Operation Auca, an attempt to contact the Huaorani tribe of Ecuador in which five American missionaries were killed. The film was produced by Bearing Fruit Productions and distributed by Every Tribe Entertainment.

Inspiration
The title of the film references Elisabeth Elliot's 1957 bestseller, Through Gates of Splendor. First published in 1957, the book told the original story of the five martyred missionaries. A low budget documentary film was also produced with the same name in 1967. One year after Gates was published, the first successful peaceful contact with the Huaorani tribe was made. In the years that followed, many Huaos were converted to Christianity and changed their lifestyle. Therefore, Beyond the Gates recounts the unfolding story up unto the present day. The film also included new information that has since come out about the Palm Beach Massacre through communication with the Indigenous people.

Beyond the Gates was very influential in the production of the drama film End of the Spear, which was released four years later. Many of the same events recounted by the Huaorani interviewees in Beyond the Gates were depicted dramatically in End of the Spear.

Filming
The film was shot on location in Ecuador; Ocala, Florida; Seattle, Washington; and at Wheaton College. There were also interviews from all five widows (two years before both Marilou McCully and Marj Saint died), members of the search party and members of the Huaorani tribe.

The crew spent 17 days in the jungle to interview members of the Huaorani tribe.

Interviewees
The Five Widows:
 Marj Saint Van Der Puy, widow of Nate Saint
 Barbara Youderian, widow of Roger Youderian
 Olive Fleming Liefeld, widow of Pete Fleming
 Marilou McCully, widow of Ed McCully
 Elisabeth Elliot Gren, widow of Jim Elliot

The Saint Family:
 Steve Saint, son of Nate Saint
 Kathy Saint Drown, daughter of Nate Saint
 Rachel Saint, sister of Nate Saint
 Jesse Saint, son of Steve Saint
 Jaime Saint, son of Steve Saint
 Ginny Saint, wife of Steve Saint

Indians:
 Carmela, a Quechua Indian who lived in Arajuno
 Mincaye
 Kimo
 Ompodae
 Dayuma
 Paa
 Dawa
 Tementa

Others:
 Dave Howard, brother of Elisabeth Elliot
 Frank Drown, missionary colleague of Roger Youderian and member of the search party, part Avant Ministries (formerly Gospel Missionary Union)
 Col. Malcolm Nurnberg, leader of the search party
 Clayton Robarchek, anthropologist
 Carole Robarchek, anthropologist
 Valerie Elliot Shepard, daughter of Jim Elliot

Awards
The film won the Crystal Heart Award at the Heartland Film Festival in 2002. It also won the Audience Award at the Palm Beach International Film Festival in 2004 for Best Documentary Feature.

References

External links
 

2002 films
American documentary films
Films about hunter-gatherers
Operation Auca
Films about Christianity
2002 documentary films
Films produced by Brent Ryan Green
Films shot in Ecuador
Films shot in Florida
Films shot in Illinois
Films shot in Seattle
2000s English-language films
Films directed by Jim Hanon
2000s American films